Skopin is a town in Ryazan Oblast, Russia, located on the Vyorda River (Oka's basin)  southwest of Ryazan. Population:

History
Skopin is considered to be one of the oldest towns in Ryazan Oblast. A settlement named Likharevskoye Gorodishche near present-day Skopin was founded some time in the 12th century. It was fortified with moats and ramparts for protection against the Cuman people.

In 1663 (or 1597, according to another account), the Tsar built a wooden fortress on the spot of today's Skopin, which would become a part of the defense system on the southeast of the Grand Duchy of Moscow. It had been called Skopinskaya sloboda since the late 17th century. In 1778, the town was renamed Skopin. In the 18th century, the town lost its military significance.

In the second half of the 19th century, mining for brown coal began in the outskirts of Skopin, which would continue until 1989. The town became known for its handicraft ceramic items with the discovery of fire clay deposits in the area. There is a museum of Skopin ceramics in the town.

Administrative and municipal status
Within the framework of administrative divisions, Skopin serves as the administrative center of Skopinsky District, even though it is not a part of it. As an administrative division, it is, together with five rural localities, incorporated separately as the town of oblast significance of Skopin—an administrative unit with the status equal to that of the districts. As a municipal division, the town of oblast significance of Skopin is incorporated as Skopin Urban Okrug.

Twin towns and sister cities
Skopin is twinned with:
 Stolin, Belarus (2014)

Born in Skopin
 Anatoly Novikov (1896–1984), composer.
 Alexander Afinogenov (1904–1941), dramatist.
 Sergey Biryuzov (1904–1964), Marshal of the Soviet Union and Chief of the General Staff of the Soviet Armed Forces.
 Viktor Mokhov (1950–), criminal.

References

Notes

Sources

Cities and towns in Ryazan Oblast
Skopinsky Uyezd